English Jamaicans are Jamaican citizens of English origin or descent.

Cuisine
The English plum pudding can be seen reflected in the local cuisine as the Jamaican fruitcake.

References

Ethnic groups in Jamaica
European Jamaican
European diaspora in North America
English Caribbean
Jamaican people of English descent